Bradyina is an extinct genus of fusulinid belonging to the family Bradyinidae. Specimens of the genus have been found in Carboniferous to Permian beds in Europe, Asia, and North America. The genus has been used as an index fossil in China.

References 

Paleozoic life
Fusulinida